Cynthia Jane "Cindy" Brogdon (born February 25, 1957) is an American former basketball player who competed in the 1976 Summer Olympics. Brogdon was inducted into the Women's Basketball Hall of Fame in 2002.

Biography
Brogdon was born in Buford, Georgia. She attended Mercer University in Georgia in 1976 and 1977, before transferring to the University of Tennessee.

She was the first Georgian to play as a member of a United States Olympic Basketball team, and was inducted into the Georgia Sports Hall of Fame in 1999.

Brogdon was named to the National team to play at the 1976 Olympics, held in Montreal, Quebec,  Canada. After losing the opening game to Japan, the USA team beat Bulgaria, but then faced host team Canada. The USA team defeated Canada 84–71. After losing to the USSR, the USA team needed a victory against Czechoslovakia to secure a medal. Brogdon helped the team to an 83–67 win and the silver medal. Brogdon averaged 5.8 points per game.

She currently works at Northview High School in Johns Creek, Georgia.

References

External links 
 Women's Basketball HOF profile

1957 births
Living people
All-American college women's basketball players
American women's basketball players
Basketball players from Georgia (U.S. state)
Basketball players at the 1976 Summer Olympics
Medalists at the 1976 Summer Olympics
Mercer University alumni
Olympic silver medalists for the United States in basketball
Tennessee Lady Volunteers basketball players
United States women's national basketball team players